Cerro Largo Department is a department of Uruguay. Its capital is Melo. It is located in the east of the country, bordering Brazil to its northeast with Yaguaron River as the natural border, Treinta y Tres Department to its south, Durazno Department to its west and the departments of Tacuarembó and Rivera to its northwest with Negro River as its natural border with them.

History
At the end of the 18th century, apart from the indigenous people, the area was populated by the Spanish and the Portuguese alike. In 1795, the Captain of the Spanish Infantry Agustín de la Rosa founded the town of Melo, a fortress to repel attacks of the Portuguese and the Indios. The territory was invaded by the Portuguese in 1801, 1811, and 1816. The history of this place is marked by battles before, during and after the Independence of the Republic.

The old Posta del Chuy,  from the town, was the historic Inn where travellers from Melo to Villa Artigas (the actual Río Branco) could rest and pay the fares for using the first public work of the Republic, the stone bridge over the stream Chuy del Tacuarí, today a Heritage Monument, built in 1855 by the French Basque brothers Etcheverry.

In 1830, when Uruguay was divided in nine departments, Cerro Largo was one of them, including the biggest part of what was later separated as the Treinta y Tres Department.

During the 19th and early 20th centuries, when intermittent periods of civil war occurred in Uruguay, the department was a stronghold of the Blanco party. This was the precursor of the Partido Nacional.

Local people are usually known as "arachanes", in memory of an extinct local ethnicity, the Arachán people.

Demographics

As of the census of 2011, Cerro Largo Department had a population of 84,698 (41,050 male and 43,648 female) and 35,841 households.

Demographic data for Florida Department in 2010:
Population growth rate: 0.571%
Birth Rate: 15.95 births/1,000 people
Death Rate: 8.64 deaths/1,000 people
Average age: 32.1 (31.0 male, 33.0 female)
Life Expectancy at Birth:
Total population: 75.86 years
Male: 72.58 years
Female: 79.04 years
Average per household income: 18,880 pesos/month
Urban per capita income: 7,801 pesos/month
2010 Data Source:

Rural population
According to the 2011 census, Cerro Largo department has a rural population of 5,936.

Map of the department

Notable people
 Aparicio Saravia was a prominent National (Blanco) Party leader, who died following the Battle of Masoller in 1904.
 Villanueva Saravia was a regional National (Blanco) Party leader.
 Rodolfo Nin Novoa has been Vice President of Uruguay (2005-2010).

See also
 List of populated places in Uruguay#Cerro Largo Department

Bibliography

References

External links

Official site - Intendencia de Cerro Largo / Geography and demographics 
Official site - Intendencia de Cerro Largo / History of the department
INE map of Cerro Largo Department
Nuestra Terra, Colección Los Departamentos, Vol.18 "Cerro Largo"

 
Departments of Uruguay
States and territories established in 1821